Lieutenant-General Sir Richard Lyttelton KB (1718 – 1 October 1770) was a British soldier and politician who served in the British Army. 

He was the fourth son of Sir Thomas Lyttelton, 4th Baronet. He served as Governor of Menorca from 1763 until 1766 after its restoration to British rule following the fall of Menorca to the French in 1756 – later returning to Britain where he died in 1770. He was also Governor of Guernsey.

He was the younger brother of George Lyttelton, 1st Baron Lyttelton, a leading MP and a friend of William Pitt, and the uncle of Thomas Lyttelton, 2nd Baron Lyttelton and Thomas Pitt, 1st Baron Camelford, MP.

Lyttelton married Rachel, Duchess of Bridgewater (widow of Scroop Egerton, 1st Duke of Bridgewater) on 14 December 1745. He was an employer of John Burrows, a physician who served as his secretary in Menorca, and later made groundbreaking research into venereal disease.

His nephew Thomas Pitt, 1st Baron Camelford, son of his sister Christian, erected an obelisk to his memory in 1771 at the family seat at Boconnoc.

See also
 List of Governors of Menorca

References

Bibliography
 Black, Jeremy. Pitt the Elder. Cambridge University Press, 1992.
 Linda E. Merians (ed). The Secret Malady. Medical, 1996

1718 births
1770 deaths
History of Menorca
Knights Companion of the Order of the Bath
British Army lieutenant generals
British MPs 1747–1754
British MPs 1754–1761
Members of the Parliament of Great Britain for English constituencies
Younger sons of baronets